Incaspis simonsii is a species of snake in the family Colubridae.  .

Distribution
The species is native to Ecuador and Peru

References

 Schmidt,K.P. & WALKER Jr. ,W.F. 1943. Snakes of the Peruvian coastal region. Zool. Ser. Field Mus. nat. Hist., Chicago, 24: 297-327 
 Parker, H.W. 1932. Some new or rare reptiles and amphibians from southern Ecuador. Ann. Mag. nat. Hist. (10) 9: 21-26 
 Dixon, J. R. 1980. The neotropical colubrid snake genus Liophis. The generic concept. Milwaukee Public Museum Contributions in Biology and Geology 31: 1-40
 Boulenger, George A. 1900. Descriptions of new batrachians and Reptiles collected by Mr. P. O. Simons in Peru. Ann. Mag. Nat. Hist. (7) 6 (32): 181-186

External links
 Biowek.bio: Incaspis simonii

Incaspis
Snakes of South America
Reptiles of Ecuador
Reptiles of Peru
Reptiles described in 1900
Taxa named by George Albert Boulenger